11252 Laërtes, provisional designation , is a mid-sized Jupiter trojan from the Greek camp, approximately  in diameter. It was discovered during a follow-up campaign of the Palomar–Leiden survey in 1973, and named after the Argonaut Laërtes from Greek mythology. The dark Jovian asteroid has a rotation period of 9.2 hours.

Discovery 

It was discovered on 19 September 1973, by Dutch astronomer couple Ingrid and Cornelis van Houten on photographic plates taken by Dutch–American astronomer Tom Gehrels at the Palomar Observatory in California. The first precovery was taken at the discovering observatory in 1951, extending the asteroid's observation arc by 22 years prior to its discovery.

As an anomaly, the asteroid did not receive a typical survey designation, although it was discovered in 1973, when the discovering trio of astronomers were conducting their second Palomar–Leiden Trojan survey (T-2).

Orbit and classification 

Laërtes is a dark Jovian asteroid in a 1:1 orbital resonance with Jupiter. It is located in the leading Greek camp at the Gas Giant's  Lagrangian point, 60° ahead on its orbit . It is also a non-family asteroid of the Jovian background population. It orbits the Sun at a distance of 5.0–5.3 AU once every 11 years and 8 months (4,260 days; semi-major axis of 5.14 AU). Its orbit has an eccentricity of 0.03 and an inclination of 6° with respect to the ecliptic.

Physical characteristics 

Laërtes is an assumed C-type asteroid, while the dominant type among the Jovian asteroid population is that of a D-type.

Rotation period 

In March 2015, a rotational lightcurve of Laërtes was obtained by Robert Stephens at the Center for Solar System Studies in California. The photometric observations showed a rotation period of  hours with a brightness variation of 0.18 magnitude.

Diameter and albedo 

According to the survey carried out by the NEOWISE mission of NASA's space-based Wide-field Infrared Survey Explorer, the asteroid measures 41.09 kilometers in diameter, and its surface has an albedo of 0.060, while the Collaborative Asteroid Lightcurve Link assumes a standard albedo for carbonaceous bodies of 0.057 and calculates a diameter of 42.23 kilometers with an absolute magnitude of 10.6.

Naming 

This minor planet was named for Laërtes, the king of Ithaca, Argonaut, husband of Anticleia, and father of Odysseus. The father of Laërtes was Arcisius, a son of the sky and thunder god and ruler of Mount Olympus, Zeus. The minor planets 651 Antikleia, 1143 Odysseus, 1151 Ithaka, 5731 Zeus were all named after these figures and places from Greek mythology. The approved naming citation was published by the Minor Planet Center on 24 January 2000.

Notes

References

External links 
 Robert Stephens, Center for Solar System Studies (CS3)
 Asteroid Lightcurve Database (LCDB), query form (info )
 Dictionary of Minor Planet Names, Google books
 Discovery Circumstances: Numbered Minor Planets (10001)-(15000) – Minor Planet Center
 Asteroid 11252 Laertes at the Small Bodies Data Ferret
 
 

011252
Discoveries by Cornelis Johannes van Houten
Discoveries by Ingrid van Houten-Groeneveld
Discoveries by Tom Gehrels
Named minor planets
19730919